The Jackal soundtrack features music from and inspired by the 1997 remake of the film of the same name. It was released in 1997 on MCA Records.

Track listing
 "Going Out of My Head" - Fatboy Slim
 "Poison" - The Prodigy
 "Superpredators (Metal Postcard)" - Massive Attack (based on samples of Siouxsie and the Banshees' "Mittageisen")
 "Star" - Primal Scream
 "Swallowed" (Goldie/Toasted on Both Sides Mix) - Bush
 "Joyful Girl" (Peace and Love Mix) - Ani DiFranco
 "Shining" - Moby
 "It's Over, It's Under" - Dollshead
 "Get Higher" - Black Grape
 "Sunray 2" - Goldie & J Majik
 "Shineaway" - BT featuring Richard Butler
 "Red Tape" - Agent Provocateur
 "Toothache" (Chemical Risk mix) - The Charlatans
 "Leave You Far Behind" - Lunatic Calm
 "Raw Power" - Apollo 440
 "Demon's Theme" - LTJ Bukem
 "Quédate Aquí" - Mariachi Ameca (Written by José Luis Cervantes)

1997 soundtrack albums
Thriller film soundtracks
Electronica soundtracks